Limavady transmitting station is a television and radio transmitter situated near the town of Limavady, County Londonderry, Northern Ireland. It is owned and operated by Arqiva.

The Limavady transmitter was brought into service on Monday 1 December 1975, to provide UHF colour television to the North West of Northern Ireland, transmitting BBC One Northern Ireland, BBC Two Northern Ireland and Ulster Television. Channel 4 would be added to the transmitter in August 1983.

A UHF relay of the transmitter was also opened on Monday 1 December 1975 at the Londonderry transmitter, which had been transmitting BBC Television (later renamed BBC One) on VHF since it commenced transmissions on Wednesday 18 December 1957.

Services available

Analogue radio

Digital radio

Digital television
Includes Sept 2019 frequency changes.

Amateur Radio

Before switchover

Analogue television
Analogue television is no longer transmitted. BBC Two was closed on 10 October 2012 and the other three services were closed on 24 October 2012.

References

External links
Limavady at ukfree.tv
Limavady at mb21.co.uk

Transmitter sites in Northern Ireland
1975 establishments in Northern Ireland
Towers completed in 1975
Buildings and structures in County Londonderry